Máel Ísu Ua Máel Chiaráin (some sources Maelisa O'Mulkerin) was a bishop in Ireland during the 12th century: he was Bishop of Clogher  from 1193 to 1197.

References

12th-century Roman Catholic bishops in Ireland
Pre-Reformation bishops of Clogher
1197 deaths